Macrocheilus dorsiger is a species of ground beetle in the subfamily Anthiinae. It was described by Maximilien Chaudoir in 1876.

References

Anthiinae (beetle)
Beetles described in 1876